The Penar branch line and the Hall's branch line, (also known as the Hall's Tramway and Hall's Road) was a standard gauge freight railway line running between Risca and the Oakdale Colliery in the South Wales coalfield. It finally closed when the colliery closed in 1989 but several sections of the trackbed, line and footbridges remain, around Crosskeys. Note that the official Network Rail Engineering Line Reference (ELR) for the Halls Road branch was HRD from Halls Road Junction (at Lime Kiln Junction, Crosskeys) to Penar Junction and from the latter to Oakdale Colliery (Colliers Arms) was PEN, the Penar branch. The line west of Penar tunnel (= railway spelling) made a junction with the Vale of Neath Line (VON) at Penar Junction. In December 1967, due to rationalisation of the railway network, the Halls Rd branch was taken out of use for a period and the closed Vale of Neath line was brought back into use between Penar Jct and Bird-in-Hand West to join the former LMS Sirhowy line to Nine Mile Point via Tredegar Jct Lower and Wyllie. For that journey, a run around siding had to be established on the barren VON formation at Penar Junction for the locomotive to run around its train for forward journey to Oakdale or return journey to Newport. When the former LMS branch to the Sirhowy Valley from Nine Mile Point closed, Halls Rd section was reopened in May 1970 until closure of the Halls Rd and Penar branches following 1989.

History

The line was originally built between 1808 and 1812 as a private tramway by Benjamin Hall, 1st Baron Llanover to connect mines he owned near Markham and Argoed in the Sirhowy Valley initially to Newbridge where it connected with the Crumlin Arm of the Monmouthshire and Brecon Canal, later probably extended to Risca.

At first the tramway was only 3 ft wide and used horses drawing small wagons for the nine mile journey.

in 1886, the line was acquired by the Great Western Railway on a thousand-year lease.

References

History of Monmouthshire
Closed railway lines in Wales